Janice Schakowsky (née Danoff; born May 26, 1944) is an American politician who has served as the U.S. representative from  since 1999. She is a member of the Democratic Party.

The district is anchored in Chicago's North Side, including much of the area bordering Lake Michigan. It also includes many of Chicago's northern suburbs, including Arlington Heights, Des Plaines, Evanston, Glenview, Kenilworth, Mount Prospect, Niles, Park Ridge, Rosemont, Skokie, Wilmette, and Winnetka, as of the decennial redistricting following the 2010 United States census.

Early life and education
Schakowsky was born Janice Danoff in 1944 in Chicago, the daughter of Tillie (née Cosnow) and Irwin Danoff. Her parents were Jewish immigrants, her father a Lithuanian Jew and her mother from Russia.

Schakowsky graduated with a Bachelor of Science in elementary education from the University of Illinois, where she was a member of Delta Phi Epsilon sorority.

Early career 
Schakowsky was Program Director of Illinois Public Action, Illinois's largest public interest group, from 1976 to 1985. She then moved to the Illinois State Council of Senior Citizens as executive director until 1990, when she was elected to the Illinois House of Representatives, representing the fourth district. In 1992, she was redistricted to the 18th district. She served there until 1998.

In 1986, Schakowsky ran for the Cook County Board of Commissioners from suburban Cook County. She won the primary to be one of the Democratic nominees, but did not win in the general election.

U.S. House of Representatives

1998 election 
Sidney Yates, who had represented the 9th district since 1949 (except for an unsuccessful run for the Senate in 1962), announced in 1996 that he would not seek reelection in 1998. Schakowsky easily won the Democratic primary, which all but assured her of election in the heavily Democratic 9th. She beat out then-Illinois State Senator Howard W. Carroll and future Illinois Governor J.B. Pritzker in the primary (who finished second and third, respectively). She won in November with 75% of the vote and was reelected 12 times.

Tenure
Schakowsky is among the most progressive members of the current U.S. Congress. She is an executive board member at large of the Congressional Progressive Caucus.

Consideration for vice president in 2004 
The Nation endorsed Schakowsky for vice president in the 2004 United States presidential election, writing that she was "the truest heir to Paul Wellstone in the current Congress". She was not selected as John Kerry's running mate.

Objection to the 2004 presidential election results 
Schakowsky was one of 31 House Democrats who voted to not count Ohio's 20 electoral votes in the 2004 presidential election. President George W. Bush won Ohio by 118,457 votes. Without Ohio's electoral votes, the election would have been decided by the House of Representatives, with each state having one vote in accordance with the Twelfth Amendment to the United States Constitution.

Tea Party opposition 
In April 2009, Schakowsky pointedly criticized the tax day Tea Party protests: "It's despicable that right-wing Republicans would attempt to cheapen a significant, honorable moment of American history with a shameful political stunt."

Women's issues 

As co-chair of the Congressional Caucus for Women's Issues, Schakowsky has been known for her support of women's issues.

Opposition to Iraq War 
Schakowsky was outspoken in her opposition to the Iraq War. She was one of the earliest and most emphatic supporters of U.S. Senator Barack Obama before he won the 2004 Illinois Democratic primary election, and actively supported his bid for the 2008 Democratic presidential nomination. On February 7, 2007, she introduced the Iraq and Afghanistan Contractor Sunshine Act (H.R. 897) in the House of Representatives, seeking information from leading federal agencies on their contracts for work in Iraq and Afghanistan. The bill was not enacted.

Climate change 
In hearings held by the House Energy and Commerce Subcommittee in July 2006, Schakowsky expressed concern that a report from the National Academy of Sciences showing discrepancies among scientists studying global warming might be "used in a way to discredit the whole notion that our country and the rest of the industrialized and developing world ought to do anything about global warming".

Angling for elevation 
Schakowsky indicated interest in replacing Barack Obama in the U.S. Senate. Before his arrest, Illinois Governor Rod Blagojevich had reportedly been considering her among at least six other candidates to fill the vacancy. Schakowsky was one of the first figures in Illinois to voice interest in running in a special election to replace Obama.

Support for public option 
In April 2009, she stated her support for a public option in health insurance, arguing that it would put health insurance companies out of business and lead to single-payer health care, which she supports.

Critique and apology for Joel Pollak 
In March 2015, the Orthodox Union criticized Schakowsky after she said that Jewish politician Joel Pollak was a "Jewish, Orthodox, Tea Party Republican" at a J Street event. She later apologized for her comments.

Support for LGBT rights 
In 2015, Schakowsky was inducted into the Chicago Gay and Lesbian Hall of Fame as a Friend of the Community. In February 2021, she voted for the Equality Act on behalf of her transgender grandson Isaac.

Boycott of Netanyahu's speech to Congress
In March 2015, Schakowsky did not attend Prime Minister of Israel Benjamin Netanyahu's speech to Congress because, she wrote in the Huffington Post, it could scuttle delicate negotiations with Iran: "The prime minister wants the negotiations to end, and his purpose in speaking to the Congress is to convince us that the president is about to agree to a deal that threatens Israel's existence. He believes the president is naïve in thinking that he and the P5+1 can achieve any agreement that will stop Iran from rushing toward a bomb ... What is the alternative to an agreement? Yes, the United States will increase sanctions. But does anyone doubt that Iran will build a nuclear weapon regardless of sanctions? Then the choices will be ugly: accepting a nuclear-weaponized Iran or accepting military action (i.e., war with Iran). For me it's obvious that we must give the negotiations a chance. And, in the meantime, Iran has essentially halted its weapons program under the Joint Plan of Action while the talks are ongoing."

Product safety issues 

Schakowsky has long taken substantial interest in product safety issues and persistently engaged in robust oversight of the U.S. Consumer Product Safety Commission. She has often been critical of Republicans on the commission.

Support of Assyrian issues
Schakowsky has been a proponent of numerous initiatives pertaining to ethnic Assyrians. According to Assyrian American activist Atour Sargon, Schakowsky was an early supporter of her ideas and encouraged her to pursue a political career as early as 2017. She claimed that Schakowsky assisted her during her successful 2019 Trustee campaign in Lincolnwood, Illinois.

During the 2017 confirmation hearings of then-Secretary of State appointee Rex Tillerson, Schakowsky criticized his support of policies that she alleged were detrimental to the future of Assyrian existence in Iraq.

Schakowsky spoke at the 2018 and 2020 Democratic Candidates' Forums organized by Vote Assyrian. At the 2020 forum, she called Assyrians "one of the fastest-growing communities in terms of political involvement".

On August 7, 2020, Schakowsky released a statement recognizing the anniversary of the 1933 Simele massacre. She is also a proponent of House Resolution 537, which would have the federal government officially recognize the Assyrian genocide if passed.

Throughout her congressional tenure, Schakowsky has supported and co-sponsored bills that would extend U.S. support for Assyrian self-governance in Iraq, particularly in the Nineveh Plains region.

Nagorno-Karabakh conflict
On October 1, 2020, Schakowsky co-signed a letter to Secretary of State Mike Pompeo that condemned Azerbaijan’s offensive operations against the Armenian-populated enclave of Nagorno-Karabakh, denounced Turkey’s role in the Nagorno-Karabakh conflict, and called for an immediate ceasefire.

Syrian conflict
In 2023, Schakowsky was among 56 Democrats to vote in favor of H.Con.Res. 21 which directed President Joe Biden to remove U.S. troops from Syria within 180 days.

Voting age
In January 2023, Schakowsky was one of 13 cosponsors of an amendment to the Constitution of the United States extending the right to vote to citizens 16 years of age or older.

Committee assignments
 Committee on Energy and Commerce 
Subcommittee on Consumer Protection & Commerce (Chair)
Subcommittee on Environment & Climate Change 
Subcommittee on Oversight and Investigations
Committee on the Budget

Party leadership and caucus memberships
 Chief Deputy Whip
 Steering and Policy Committee
 Founding member of the Out-of-Iraq Caucus
 Democratic Vice Chair of the bipartisan Women's Caucus
 Vice Chair of the Congressional Progressive Caucus
 Congressional Arts Caucus
 Afterschool Caucuses
 Congressional Asian Pacific American Caucus
Climate Solutions Caucus
Medicare for All Caucus
Blue Collar Caucus

Electoral history

Cook County Board of Commissioners (suburban Cook County)
1986

Illinois House
1990

1992

1994

1996

U.S. House
1998

2000

2002

2004

2006

2008

2010

2012

2014

2016

2018

2020

2022

Personal life
Schakowsky lives in Evanston, Illinois, with her husband Robert Creamer. She has two children and a stepchild.

In 2005, Creamer pleaded guilty to failure to collect withholding tax and to bank fraud for writing checks with insufficient funds. All the money was repaid. Schakowsky was not accused of wrongdoing. While she served on the organization's board during the time the crimes occurred, and signed the IRS filings along with Creamer, the U.S. district judge noted that no one suffered "out of pocket losses", and Creamer acted not out of greed but in an effort to keep his community action group going without cutting programs, though he paid his own $100,000 salary with fraudulently obtained funds. Creamer served five months in prison. Assistant U.S. Attorney Joseph Ferguson said the government did not believe Creamer "acknowledged the seriousness of his conduct". "At the end of the day", Ferguson said, "Robert Creamer is guilty of multiple crimes and is going to jail for it".

On July 20, 2022, Schakowsky was arrested in front of the Supreme Court building after she and 33 others, including 15 members of Congress, allegedly refused to comply with orders to stop blocking traffic. She uploaded a clip of it to Twitter, adding: "Today, I am making good trouble."

See also
 List of Jewish members of the United States Congress
 Women in the United States House of Representatives

References

External links

 Congresswoman Jan Schakowsky official U.S. House website
 Jan Schakowsky for Congress
 

|-

|-

|-

1944 births
21st-century American politicians
21st-century American women politicians
American people of Lithuanian-Jewish descent
American people of Russian-Jewish descent
Democratic Party members of the United States House of Representatives from Illinois
Female members of the United States House of Representatives
Jewish members of the United States House of Representatives
Jewish women politicians
Living people
Democratic Party members of the Illinois House of Representatives
People from Evanston, Illinois
Politicians from Chicago
University of Illinois College of Education alumni
Women state legislators in Illinois
21st-century American Jews
American Jews from Illinois